Mercury Radio may refer to:
 102.7 Mercury FM, former radio station broadcasting to Surrey and Sussex, England
 Hertfordshire's Mercury 96.6, former radio station broadcasting to southern Hertfordshire, England
 Mercury Radio Arts, a production company founded by American commentator Glenn Beck